Webster Pass may refer to:
 Webster Pass (Antarctica), a snow pass in Marie Byrd Land.
 Webster Pass (Colorado), a mountain pass on the Continental Divide of the Americas in the Front Range of Colorado, United States.
 Webster Pass (New Mexico), a mountain pass in Colfax County, New Mexico, United States.

See also